Tariel Zintiridis (born 20 December 1987 in Tbilisi) is a Greek judoka.

Achievements

References

External links
 
 
 

1987 births
Living people
Greek male judoka
Sportspeople from Tbilisi
Judoka at the 2008 Summer Olympics
Olympic judoka of Greece
21st-century Greek people